Case study in psychology refers to the use of a descriptive research approach to obtain an in-depth analysis of a person, group, or phenomenon. A variety of techniques may be employed including personal interviews, direct-observation, psychometric tests, and archival records. In psychology case studies are most often used in clinical research to describe rare events and conditions, which contradict well established principles in the field of psychology. Case studies are generally a single-case design, but can also be a multiple-case design, where replication instead of sampling is the criterion for inclusion. Like other research methodologies within psychology, the case study must produce valid and reliable results in order to be useful for the development of future research. Distinct advantages and disadvantages are associated with the case study in psychology. The case study is sometimes mistaken for the case method, but the two are not the same.

Advantages
One major advantage of the case study in psychology is the potential for the development of novel hypotheses for later testing. Second, the case study can provide detailed descriptions of specific and rare cases

Disadvantages 
Case studies  cannot be used to determine causation.

Famous case studies in psychology 

Harlow - Phineas Gage
Breuer & Freud (1895) - Anna O.
Cleckley's (1941) case studies of psychopathy (The Mask of Sanity) and multiple personality disorder (The Three Faces of Eve) (1957)
Freud and Little Hans
Freud and the Rat Man
John Money and the John/Joan case
Genie (feral child)
Piaget's studies
Rosenthal's book on the murder of Kitty Genovese
Washoe (sign language)
Patient H.M.
Lev Zasetsky (A.R. Luria)
Solomon Shereshevsky (A.R. Luria)
When Prophecy Fails published in 1956, this study was done on a group that believed aliens were going to save them soon as the world was about to end, and what would happen to them when the day of ending didn't happen.

See also
Case study
Research method

References

^ Schultz & Schultz, Duane (2010). Psychology and work today. New York: Prentice Hall. pp. 201–202. .

Psychological tests and scales